Leopoldo Federico (12 January 1927 – 28 December 2014) was an Argentine bandoneon player, arranger, director and composer.

Life
Born in the district of Once in the city of Buenos Aires, Argentina, Federico was one of the most outstanding bandoneonists in the history of tango and was a member of a number of the major orchestras of the 1940s and 50s including those of Juan Carlos Cobián, Alfredo Gobbi, Víctor D'Amario, Osmar Maderna, Héctor Stamponi, Mariano Mores, Carlos di Sarli, Horacio Salgán and Aníbal Troilo.

By 1952 he was making frequent appearances at the Tibidabo cabaret and was often heard on Radio Belgrano.

In 1955 he joined Astor Piazzolla's Octeto Buenos Aires and later that year, with his own orquesta típica, he made many recordings with the singer Julio Sosa. He appeared on the Selección Nacional de Tango album En Vivo in 2005. He died on 28 December 2014. He was 87.

References

Leopoldo Federico: el inefable bandonéon del tango, by Jorge Dimov and Esther Echenbaum Jonisz, Gourmet Musical, 2009.

External links
Todo tango:Federico

1927 births
2014 deaths
Musicians from Buenos Aires
Argentine bandoneonists
Latin music composers